The Voice of Love (German: Die Stimme der Liebe) is a 1934 German musical comedy film directed by Victor Janson and starring Marcel Wittrisch, Maria Beling, Marieluise Claudius. It was in the tradition of operetta films. It portrays a complex series of interactions between a celebrated tenor and a female music student who has decided to romantically pursue him.

The film's sets were designed by the art director Fritz Maurischat.

Cast
 Marcel Wittrisch as Kammersänger Ekhardt  
 Maria Beling as Cläre  
 Marieluise Claudius as Zenzi  
 Kurt Vespermann as Seppl, Ekhardt Diener  
 Oskar Sima as Der Wirt  
 Karl Platen as Der Korrepetitor  
 Vicky Werckmeister as Die Köchin  
 Fritz Alberti as Der Graf  
 Otto Sauter-Sarto as Ein Gast  
 Tina Eilers as Die Freundin  
 Arthur Reppert as Der Feuerwehrmann  
 Charlotte Boerner as Die Kaiserin  
 Gustav Püttjer as Standfotograf

References

Bibliography 
 Waldman, Harry. Nazi Films in America, 1933–1942. McFarland, 2008.

External links 
 

1934 musical comedy films
German musical comedy films
1934 films
Films of Nazi Germany
1930s German-language films
Films directed by Victor Janson
Operetta films
Terra Film films
German black-and-white films
Films scored by Eduard Künneke
1930s German films